Yale-Lillooet was a provincial electoral district for the Legislative Assembly of British Columbia, Canada.

It first appeared in the 1966 General Election, when it superseded the older Lillooet riding, which was one of the province's original twelve ridings, as well as the equally old Yale riding, parts of which were also in Yale-Lillooet.  Yale-Lillooet was last contested in the 2005 General Election; in 2009 it was largely replaced by Fraser-Nicola, with the Fraser Canyon portions in the southwest transferred to Chilliwack-Hope and the town of Keremeos in the extreme southeast transferred to Boundary-Similkameen.

Demographics

Geography 
The riding was largely rural and wilderness in character despite its proximity to the Lower Mainland, it spanned the Bridge River-Lillooet, Ashcroft-Thompson Canyon, Fraser Canyon, Nicola and Similkameen Districts.

Since creation its shape remained relatively unchanged despite some minor boundary adjustments, with (e.g.) Ashcroft-Cache Creek joining Cariboo South in some elections and the Similkameen area joined to one of the Okanagan ridings.  Its core towns - Lillooet, Lytton, Yale, Boston Bar, Hope, Princeton, Merritt and Spences Bridge remained permanently in the riding until its demise.

Its boundary was roughly described by a quadrangle formed by and including the towns of:
Gold Bridge-Bralorne
Hope
Keremeos
Cache Creek-Ashcroft

Other towns within the riding are:
Hedley
Princeton
Tulameen
Coalmont
Aspen Grove
Logan Lake
Lac le Jeune
Lower Nicola
Spences Bridge
Lytton
Boston Bar-North Bend
Spuzzum
Hope
Lillooet
Shalalth-Seton Portage
Fountain
Pavilion
Hat Creek

The riding's largest and therefore electorally dominant population centre was Merritt.  The riding was heavily mountainous and all its towns were all fairly isolated from each other by terrain and the necessarily difficult roads of the canyons and mountain valleys interconnecting them.  Many of the electorate are scattered through smaller communities throughout the region, particularly on Indian reserves and in recreational property areas of the Bridge River Country, the Nicola-Similkameen and the Fraser Canyon.

Yale-Lillooet had the highest proportion of aboriginal voters in southern British Columbia and one of the highest proportions in the province.  All reserves and local bands of the Nlaka'pamux and Nicola peoples were included within the riding, as well as those of the Upper St'at'imc and the upriver Sto:lo around Hope and Yale.

History 
Hope, Yale, Boston Bar, Lillooet, Lytton and Princeton are some of the oldest towns in the province, dating to the founding of the Crown Colony during the Fraser Canyon Gold Rush. Merritt is of slightly later date and was an isolated ranching town until the opening of the Coquihalla Highway in the mid-1980s, which caused its population to boom.

The riding has traditionally been a swing riding with both strong conservative and liberal elements in its politics, and is also considered a bellwether riding although not always winding up in Government benches.  The major industries are forestry and transportation-oriented services and tourism and recreation.

Members of Legislative Assembly 
Over the district's existence, it elected the following members of the Legislative Assembly of British Columbia:

Election results 

|-

|-
 
|NDP
|Victor York
|align="right"|2,817
|align="right"|17.19%
|align="right"|
|align="right"|$26,185

|}

Liberal totals reflect James Rabbitt's personal swing when he was a Social Credit Member.

References

External links 
BC Stats - 2001 (pdf)
Results of 2001 election (pdf)
2001 Expenditures (pdf)
Results of 1996 election
1996 Expenditures (pdf)
Results of 1991 election
1991 Expenditures
Website of the Legislative Assembly of British Columbia

Former provincial electoral districts of British Columbia
Lillooet